Street Racers is a 2008 Russian action film directed by Oleg Fesenko.

Plot 
Stepan returns from the army. His father’s auto shop is now owned by a certain Docker who organizes street racing. Street racing is not a goal, but a way of life, a passion that unites all kinds of people. Even such as Stepan and Docker. They are similar: both do not just love cars do not think of life without speed and risk. But the principles of one are empty words for another, and therefore a collision is inevitable. Especially as Stepan falls in love with Katya,  Docker's girlfriend.

Cast 
 Aleksey Chadov as  Stepan
 Marina Aleksandrova as Katya
 Stanislav Bondarenko  as Docker
 Nikolai Chindyajkin as Lieutenant Colonel Stepanchenko, Katya's father
 Elvira Bolgova as Laura
 Aleksei Guskov as auto mechanic Mokhov, Stepan's father
 Alexander Slastin as  Sergey Petrovich, General, Chief of the State Traffic Safety Inspectorate

Criticism 
Oleg Fesenko’s film was generally negatively received by both viewers and professional critics. On IMDb it has a rating of 2.9 / 10, on KinoPoisk  same 3.6 / 10. A film was noted by critics as an unsuccessful attempt at a repeat success of Fast and the Furious.

References

External links 
 

2008 films
Russian action films
2000s Russian-language films
Russian auto racing films
Films set in Moscow
2008 action films
Films shot in Moscow
Russian vigilante films
2000s vigilante films